Pseudolithos is a genus of succulent flowering plants of the family Apocynaceae, indigenous to arid areas of Somalia, Yemen and Oman.

Description and naming
The plants were first described as a genus in 1965; the name "Pseudo-lithos" means "false-stone" and refers to their pebble-like appearance. It was originally proposed as Lithocaulon earlier in 1956, but this name was already in use for a genus of fossil algae. All species in this genus are highly succulent, small in size, and exhibit tessellation on their stems' surface. Their small flowers appear on the spherical body's surface.

Species 

 Pseudolithos caput-viperae Lavranos - Somalia
 Pseudolithos cubiformis (P.R.O. Bally) P.R.O. Bally - N Somalia
 Pseudolithos dodsonianus (Lavranos) Bruyns & Meve - Somalia & Oman	
 Pseudolithos gigas Dioli - Eastern Ethiopia 
 Pseudolithos harardheranus Dioli - Somalia 
 Pseudolithos horwoodii P.R.O. Bally & Lavranos - Somalia
 Pseudolithos mccoyi Lavranos - Yemen & Oman
 Pseudolithos migiurtinus (Chiov.) P.R.O. Bally - S + C Somalia
 Pseudolithos sphaericus (P.R.O. Bally) P.R.O. Bally - N Somalia

Taxonomy
Phylogenetic studies have shown the genus to be monophyletic, and most closely related to the widespread Caralluma stapeliads of North Africa. Marginally more distantly related is a sister branch comprising the genera Echidnopsis and Rhytidocaulon.

References

External links

Dave's Garden
Columbus Cactus Club photos

Apocynaceae genera
Asclepiadoideae